The 2008 Bonnaroo Music and Arts Festival was held June 12–15. Aside from the festival's opening year (2002), attendance at the 2008 event, at approximately 70,000, was the smallest in Bonnaroo's history.

Cancellations and rescheduling
Bonnaroo had many cancellations and reschedules by artists both before and during the event. Cancellations included Black Kids, who appeared on the initial line-up but were later removed. Two months prior, due to health issues, The Allman Brothers Band cancelled their slot at the festival. Their cancellation led to the replacement band Widespread Panic being announced as the festival closer. Due to a schedule conflict, David Cross also had to cancel his appearance and was replaced by Louis C.K. in the Bonnaroo Comedy Theatre.

During the festival
The surprise SuperJam was composed of Les Claypool on bass/vocals, Eugene Hutz (guitar/vocals), Sergei Ryabtsev (violin), Oren Kaplan (guitar), and Yuri Lemeshev (accordion) of Gogol Bordello, and Claypool's touring drummer (and Cake member) Paulo Baldi on drums. They were later joined by Kirk Hammett of Metallica on guitar for three numbers. Hammett was introduced by Claypool as "some guy that used to sell me weed back in high school." The set consisted of eleven Tom Waits covers ("Russian Dance" was performed twice, the second time as an encore), along with a single Claypool song, "D's Diner".

Chris Rock's main stage set was billed as being "one of the largest ever for a comedy show".

Kidz Jam, a non-profit organization out of Dayton, Ohio provided free entertainment, water, earplugs and safety information for the families which attended Bonnaroo in 2008.

Kanye West's Saturday night set, having been moved back and forth between stages by Bonnaroo promoters, eventually ran on the main stage. West was not on time due to a scheduling conflict. This, in addition to Pearl Jam playing over an hour longer than scheduled and taking a long time to remove their equipment, and the complex stage set-up for West's performance, meant the show started at 5:00 am.

Line-up

Somethin' Else- New Orleans:

Porter – Batiste – Stoltz
Dirty Dozen Brass Band
Big Sam's Funky Nation
Morning 40 Federation
Ivan Neville's Dumpstaphunk
Walter "Wolfman" Washington
Trombone Shorty & Orleans Avenue
Harrybu McCage
Henry Butler and the Game Band
Anders Osborne
Soul Rebels Brass Band
New Orleans Superjam led by George Porter Jr.

Bonnaroo Comedy:

Chris Rock
Louis C.K.
Janeane Garofalo
Reggie Watts
Zach Galifianakis
Jim Norton
Brian Posehn
Joe DeRosa
Mike Birbiglia
John Mulaney
Michelle Buteau
Leo Allen

Cafe Acts

Alana Grace
Amy LaVere
Bear in Heaven
Bombadil
Carney
Colour Revolt
Cornmeal
De Novo Dahl
Dead Confederate
Electric Touch
Erick Baker
Extra Golden
Howlin Rain
Jake Shimabukuro
Jessie Baylin
Jypsi
K'naan
Lord T & Eloise
Mike Farris featuring Roseland Rhythm Revue
The Nikhil Korula Band
Nomo
Person L
Phonograph
The Postelles
Rotary Downs
Royal Bangs
Scissormen
Sometymes Why
stephaniesid
Tennessee Schmaltz
The Afromotive
The American Plague
The Big Sleep
The Duhks
the Everybodyfields
The Greencards
Weather Underground
Your Vegas

Cinema Tent

Heavy Metal in Baghdad

References

Bonnaroo Music Festival by year
2008 in American music
2008 music festivals
Bonnaroo
2008 in Tennessee